James Michael Leonard (January 2, 1899 – February 2, 1979) was an American football player.  A native of Geneseo, New York, he played professional football a tackle for the Rochester Jeffersons in the National Football League (NFL). He appeared in three NFL games during the 1923 season.

References

1899 births
1979 deaths
Rochester Jeffersons players
People from Geneseo, New York
Players of American football from New York (state)